The Noack Organ Company is a pipe organ manufacturer based out of Georgetown, Massachusetts.

Fritz Noack began the company in 1960 in Lawrence, Massachusetts. Prior to that he had worked with a number of organ builders in Europe and the United States. He would later move his firm to Andover before moving to Georgetown in 1970.

The company has produced a number of organs throughout the United States, as well building organs in Japan and Iceland.

References

External links
 Noack Organ Company

Pipe organ building companies
Companies based in Massachusetts
Companies based in Lawrence, Massachusetts
Georgetown, Massachusetts
Manufacturing companies established in 1960
1960 establishments in Massachusetts
Musical instrument manufacturing companies of the United States